John Cowell may refer to:

 John Cowell (jurist) (1554–1611), English jurist
 John G. Cowell (1785–1814), officer in the United States Navy
 John F. Cowell (1852–1915), American botanist
 John Cowell (RAF airman) (1889–1918), Irish World War I flying ace for No. 20 Squadron RAF
 Sir John Clayton Cowell (1832–1894), British Army general and Master of the Queen's Household
 Jack Cowell (1887–?), English footballer